Delilah is a feminine given name of uncertain meaning. The best known Delilah is the Biblical character.

The name has been in use in the United States and United Kingdom since the mid-1600s. The increase in the usage of the name in the Anglosphere has been attributed to the influence of the 2006 popular song Hey There Delilah by the Plain White T's as well as its similarity in sound to other currently popular names such as Leila, Lila, and Lily. Another source notes its similarity in sound to the etymologically unrelated words delightful and lilac.

Usage
It has been among the top one thousand names used for girls in the United States since 1997 and among the one hundred most used names for American girls since 2018.  It has been among the five hundred most used for girls in England and Wales since 2008 and among the top one hundred names for girls since 2018.  The variant Dalila was among the most popular names for newborn girls in 2021 in Bosnia and Herzegovina.

Notable people
 Delilah Cotto, Puerto Rican American actress, dancer and model
 Delilah S. Dawson (born 1977), American fantasy and science fiction writer
 Delilah DiCrescenzo (born 1983), American distance runner
 Delilah Gore (born 1962), Papua New Guinean politician
 Delilah Hamlin (born 1998), daughter of Lisa Rinna and Harry Hamlin
 Delila Hatuel (born 1980), Israeli fencer
 Delilah Montoya, (born 1955), American contemporary artist and educator
 Delilah Pierce (1904–1992), African-American artist, curator and educator
 Delilah Rene, better known simply as Delilah (born 1960), American radio personality

Notes

See also 
 Dalilah (disambiguation)

Feminine given names